Larry Joseph Stockmeyer (1948 – 31 July 2004) was an American computer scientist. He was one of the pioneers in the field of computational complexity theory, and he also worked in the field of distributed computing.  He died of pancreatic cancer.

Career 

 1972: BSc in mathematics, Massachusetts Institute of Technology.
 1972: MSc in electrical engineering, Massachusetts Institute of Technology.
 1974: PhD in computer science, Massachusetts Institute of Technology.
 Supervisor: Albert R. Meyer.
 1974–1982: IBM Research, Thomas J. Watson Research Center, Yorktown Heights, NY.
 1982–November 2003: IBM Research, Almaden Research Center, San Jose, CA.
 October 2002–2004: University of California, Santa Cruz, Computer Science Department – Research Associate.

Recognition 

 1996: Fellow of the Association for Computing Machinery: "For several fundamental contributions to computational complexity theory, which have significantly affected the course of this field."
 2007: The Edsger W. Dijkstra Prize in Distributed Computing for the paper .

Notable publications 

  — this work introduced the polynomial hierarchy.
  — "one of the most remarkable doctoral theses in computer science".
  — this work introduced alternating Turing machines.
  — this paper received the Dijkstra Prize in 2007.

Notes

References 
 .
 
 .
 .
 .
 .
 . PhD Thesis.
 
 
 
 
  Includes the program of 'Larry Stockmeyer Commemoration' (21 May 2005).

External links 
 Larry Stockmeyer's Home Page.
 

1948 births
2004 deaths
American computer scientists
Theoretical computer scientists
Researchers in distributed computing
MIT School of Engineering alumni
University of California, Santa Cruz faculty
Fellows of the Association for Computing Machinery
Dijkstra Prize laureates
Massachusetts Institute of Technology School of Science alumni